The Abraham Pais Prize for History of Physics is an award given each year since 2005 jointly by the American Physical Society and the American Institute of Physics for "outstanding scholarly achievements in the history of physics". The prize is named after Abraham Pais (1918-2000), science historian and particle physicist; as of 2013 it is valued at $10,000.

Recipients 
Source: American Physical Society

See also
 List of physics awards

External links 
 Abraham Pais Prize for History of Physics, American Physical Society

References 

Awards of the American Physical Society
Awards of the American Institute of Physics
History of science awards